Myxobolus spinacurvatura is a species of Myxozoa in the family Myxobolidae, that inhabits the Mediterranean Sea and the northwestern Pacific Ocean. M. spinacurvatura is a parasitic Cnidarian that infects the Flathead grey mullet, Mugil cephalus. When inside Mugil cephalus, M. spinacurvatura targets mesenteric vessels. M. spinacurvatura also often inhabit a single host alongside multiple other parasitic Myxozoans such as M. bizerti, M. ichkeulensis, and M. episquamalis.

References

Animals described in 1990
Myxobolidae
Fauna of the Mediterranean Sea